Areca chaiana is a species of flowering plant in the family Arecaceae. It is a tree endemic to Borneo. It is threatened by habitat loss but occurs in Lanjak Entimau Wildlife Sanctuary and Semengoh Arboretum near Kuching, Sawak.

References

chaiana
Endemic flora of Borneo
Trees of Borneo
Data deficient plants
Plants described in 1984
Taxonomy articles created by Polbot
Taxa named by John Dransfield